According to the Angel Capital Association, an angel group or angel network is individual angel investors joining together with other angel investors to evaluate and invest in entrepreneurial companies. These angels typically pool their capital to make larger investments. Some characteristics of angel networks are: meeting regularly to review business proposals, deciding collectively whether to invest or not, and working together to conduct due diligence to validate the plans, statements and history of the companies founding team, Between 10,000 and 15,000 angels are believed to belong to angel groups in the U.S. Angel groups also sometimes co-invest with other angel groups, individual angels and very early-stage venture capitalists to make larger, aggregate investments.

Types of angel networks
There are three types of Angel Networks. 
 Non- profit Business Angel Associations : Association of Angels facilitating Angel's investments in local Companies for a stake in the company
 Incubators- Group of Angel hosting companies in exchange for a stake in the company
 For Profit Angel Networks - Networks enabling Entrepreneurs to Meet Business Angels. They often work on a Success Fee and Entrance Fee basis.

Types of fees
 Equity Fee- Proportional stake of the amount invested in the company concerned. 
 Registration Fee- Fee paid by Entrepreneurs in order to have access to the Angel Network. 
 Success Fee- Percentage of the investment paid to the Network.

Comparison table

See also 
 Angel Investors
 Incubator

References

Angel investors